Kalyani Expressway is a , two-laned, tolled road which connects Kolkata with its satellite town, Kalyani in Nadia district. The road starts from Nimta in the North 24 Parganas district, in the North suburban fringes of Kolkata and ends in Kalyani. The road is maintained and controlled by Kolkata Metropolitan Development Authority (KMDA). Currently it is being converted to 6 lane road till Muragacha and 4 lane from Muragacha to Kalyani by the KMDA. The road is also being linked to Belghoria Expressway by an elevated corridor, land acquisition is complete and construction is going on in full swing despite COVID-19 scenario.
 
It makes access to AIIMS Kalyani easy

Importance 
The road acts as a bypass avoiding the congested roads along the towns and cities, like Sodepur, Barrackpore, Naihati, which developed along the Hooghly River. The road has significantly brought down the communication time between the cities from two hours to one hour. The road has important connecting feeder roads with Sodepur, Barrackpore, Naihati, Barasat, Madhyamgram, Kankinara, Khardaha and Kanchrapara, apart from roads which connects other small towns and localities on the way. The road has intersection with State Highway 1 and State Highway 2 and connects with National Highway 12 at different places. An extension of Kalyani Expressway connects the State Highway 6 near Bansberia through Ishwar Gupta Setu over the Bhagirathi-Hooghly River.

References

Roads in West Bengal
Transport in Kalyani, West Bengal
Toll roads in India
Expressways in West Bengal